Perl is an open-source programming language whose first version, 1.0, was released in 1987. The following table contains the Perl 5 version history, showing its release versions. Not all versions are covered yet.

Note that additional minor release versions are not shown in this chart, unless they include notable changes or are the latest supported version. Additional information can be found on the official Perl website.

Version history 

Note that Perl Maintenance and Support Policy is to "support the two most recent stable release series".

Release numbers use semantic versioning since 5.6, where even-numbered minor versions (e.g. 5.36) are stable releases, and odd numbers are experimental development versions. The patch number is usually omitted in discussions of Perl versions.

References

Perl
Software version histories